Lamar Jordan (born October 2, 1994) is an American football wide receiver who is currently a free agent. He played college football at New Mexico as a quarterback and professionally as a wide receiver for the Hamburg Sea Devils.

Professional career
Jordan signed with the Atlanta Falcons as an undrafted free agent on May 1, 2018, and was waived on September 1.

Jordan participated in the Edmonton Eskimos rookie minicamp and XFL showcase. Jordan was signed on November 17, 2019, to the Massachusetts Pirates of the National Arena League, and was released in May 2020.

In December 2021 Jordan signed with Hamburg Sea Devils in the European League of Football (ELF).

References

External links
New Mexico Lobos bio

Further reading 
 New Mexico or Air Force? QB Lamar Jordan chose Lobos out of a hat, Colorado Springs Gazette
 Lobo Jordan insists he works as hard as ever, Albuquerque Journal
 Redshirts compete to be the Lobos' No. 3 QB, Albuquerque Journal

1994 births
Living people
American football quarterbacks
American football wide receivers
New Mexico Lobos football players
Atlanta Falcons players
Players of American football from Texas
Massachusetts Pirates players
Hamburg Sea Devils (ELF) players
American expatriate players of American football
American expatriate sportspeople in Germany